Hotel is a 1997 eight-episode BBC "fly on the wall" production that followed the general day-to-day running of a hotel giving viewers a rare glimpse of life behind the scenes of the Britannia Adelphi Hotel in Liverpool. The series first aired 3 November 1997 on BBC1 with the first episode receiving viewing figures on 11 million. The series was directed by Neil Grant and narrated by Andrew Sachs.

Employees depicted

Just cook, will yer? 
The phrase "Just cook, will yer?" became famous within Liverpool area, following the scenes in an episode when an argument between Deputy manager Brian Birchall and head chef David Smith resulted in the phrase being bellowed by Brian.
The outburst became a local catch-phrase and was printed on T-shirts and various merchandise. The phrase also made it into the charts after it was released as a single by Alternative Radio

Criticism 
Following the first episode the Britannia Hotel chain owner reported that he felt the hotel had been poorly portrayed and criticised the BBC for screening scenes that showed the hotel staff trying to handle the situation following the Irish Republican Army (IRA) bomb threat during the 1997 Grand National.

References

External links
 
 

1997 British television series debuts
1997 British television series endings
1990s British documentary television series
BBC television documentaries
Business-related television series in the United Kingdom
English-language television shows
Hospitality industry in the United Kingdom
Television shows set in Liverpool